Educating My Father (Greek: O babas ekpaidevetai) is a 1953 Greek comedy film directed by Giorgos Lazaridis and Nikos Tsiforos and starring Petros Kyriakos, Sasa Dario and Giorgos Kabanellis.

Cast
 Petros Kyriakos as Prokopis Kolaouzos  
 Sasa Dario as Riri  
 Giorgos Kabanellis as Giannis Kolaouzos  
 Gelly Mavropoulou as Myrto  
 Nicos Matheos as Skouratzos  
 Nana Papadopoulou as Riri's Mother  
 Alekos Anastasiadis as Nikolas  
 Dimitris Aviatis 
 Kostas Pomonis 
 Kostas Papakonstantinou
 Dimitris Koukis as Alex Vranas  
 Nasos Patetsos as Singer 
 Zozo Sapountzaki as Singer  
 Sofy as Dancer  
 Vallas as Dancer  
 Kostas Voutsas

References

Bibliography
 Achilleas Hadjikyriacou. Masculinity and Gender in Greek Cinema: 1949-1967. Bloomsbury Publishing, 2013.

External links
 

1953 films
1953 comedy films
1950s Greek-language films
Greek comedy films
Greek black-and-white films